Lucky Logic is a programming tool for the Fischertechnik computing models.  It uses a graphical programming language.

The first version was released in 1991 for IBM PC (DOS), Atari ST and Amiga in the course of the modular computing professional.

External links 
 knobloch-gmbh.de - Download einer LLWin-Demoversion
 pro-sign.de - LLWin-Herstellerseite (kein Support)

Programming tools